The Angels of Light Sing 'Other People' is the fourth studio album by Angels of Light. Produced by band leader Michael Gira, it was released on March 21, 2005, via Gira's own record label, Young God Records. It is the band's first album to feature extensive contributions from American folk music outfit Akron/Family, who played on every song of the album.

Critical reception
Upon its release, The Angels of Light Sing 'Other People' received positive reviews from music critics. At Metacritic, which assigns a normalized rating out of 100 to reviews from critics, the album received an average score of 80, which indicates "generally favorable reviews", based on 12 reviews. On the album, Greg Prato of Allmusic wrote: "Obviously, not what most Swans fans would expect from Gira, but in terms of a strong singer-songwriter album, Angels of Light Sing Other People is definitely a worthy listen. Mike Diver of Drowned in Sound gave the album a perfect 10 score and stated: " It is utterly engaging, totally absorbing and, well, absolutely essential." He also described the album as "a record rich in honesty, in true human emotions and wishes and woes." Sam Ubl of Pitchfork wrote: "Gira's songs have many one-of-a-kind nuances that tether the album even when it ventures," He also commented that "the album goes easy on the sexual anger, capitulating to a refreshingly mundane flavor of storytelling." Mike Powell of Stylus Magazine stated: "Sing ‘Other People’ leaves behind much of the violence of Gira's approach but retains the same soul-plunging ambitions, both allying him effortlessly with the druggy expressivity that characterizes practitioners of newer psychedelic music and belatedly identifying him as an influence and antecedent."

Some critics also noted the absence of drums from most of the recording, which was reported to be limited to "only 10 seconds".

Track listing

Personnel
Angels of Light
Michael Gira  – vocals, production, arrangement, design, acoustic guitar, harmonica and various other instruments

Additional musicians
Dana Janssen (Akron/Family) – drums, glockenspiel, bass guitar, electric guitar, percussion, piano, saxophone, synthesizer, vocals
Seth Olinsky (Akron/Family) – banjo, Casio, acoustic guitar, electric guitar, organ, piano, synthesizer, vocals
Miles Seaton (Akron/Family) – Casio, acoustic guitar, bass guitar, electric guitar, sounds, synthesizer, vocals
Ryan Vanderhoof (Akron/Family) – Casio, acoustic guitar, electric guitar, slide guitar, synthesizer, vocals
Paul Cantelon  – violin
Siobhan Duffy  – vocals
Patrick Fondiller  – mandolin
Jerome O'Brien  – double bass
Julia Kent  – cello

Other personnel
Bryce Goggin  – mixing
Doug Henderson  – mastering
Ben Kirkendoll  – layout design, technical supervision, technician
Jason LaFarge  – audio engineering

References

External links
 The Angels of Light Sing 'Other People' on Young God Records

2005 albums
Angels of Light albums
Young God Records albums
Albums produced by Michael Gira